René Andrei (25 February 1906 – 20 August 1987) was a French sculptor. His work was part of the sculpture event in the art competition at the 1924 Summer Olympics.

References

1906 births
1987 deaths
20th-century French sculptors
20th-century French male artists
French male sculptors
Olympic competitors in art competitions
Sculptors from Paris